The 2021 World Karate Championships were held from 16 to 21 November 2021 in Dubai, United Arab Emirates.

Medalists

Men

Women

Medal table

References

External links
Results book

World Karate Championships
 
World Championships
2021 in Emirati sport
International sports competitions hosted by the United Arab Emirates
Sports competitions in Dubai
World Karate Championships